Kelly Kenison Falkner (born March 1, 1960) is an American chemical oceanographer and educator. She is the Director of the National Science Foundation's (NSF's) Office of Polar Programs (OPP). Her work in the position led her NSF colleagues to name the Falkner Glacier, in Victoria Land, Antarctica, after her.

Early life and education
Born in Lancaster, New Hampshire, Falkner received a B.A. in Chemistry with a minor in Russian from Reed College in Oregon in 1983. She then earned her PhD in Chemical Oceanography from the Massachusetts Institute of Technology/Woods Hole Oceanographic Institution joint doctoral program in 1989.

Career and impact
Prior to joining the NSF as Deputy Head of OPP on 3 January 2011, Falkner was a professor at Oregon State University's College of Earth, Oceanic and Atmospheric Sciences from 1992-2011. She taught and conducted research using state-of-the-art chemical measurements to investigate a wide array of environmental topics. Falkner's research as a sea-going oceanographer for 30 years took her all over the world from two miles below the sea surface, to Lake Baikal, the Greenland Ice Cap, the Black Sea and the world's oceans. She has 20 years of leading field research in the Arctic including over a decade of being a member of the North Pole Environmental Observatory as well as Chief Scientist on multiple Arctic icebreaking and aircraft based expeditions.

During 2007-2009, Falkner was the founding Program Director of the Antarctic Integrated System Science in the Antarctic Science Division of the National Science Foundation Office of Polar Programs.  In 2011, Falkner joined the National Science Foundation permanently, as the Deputy Head of Polar Programs, which manages the NSF's funding for research and  support in the polar regions. She became Director of NSF's Office of Polar Programs (OPP) effective 1 April 2012 subsequent to the retirement of Dr. Karl A. Erb.

Awards and honours
Her success in the position led her National Science Foundation colleagues to name the Falkner Glacier, in Victoria Land, Antarctic after her. She has also been awarded the National Science Foundation Arctic Service Award( 2000), and received a Presidential Rank Award for Meritorious Service (2018). In 2019, Falkner was named a fellow of the American Association for the Advancement of Science.

References

External links
Falkner's CV from Oregon State University

Living people
1960 births
People from Lancaster, New Hampshire
American oceanographers
Women oceanographers
Reed College alumni
Massachusetts Institute of Technology alumni
Oregon State University faculty
American Antarctic scientists
Women Antarctic scientists
American women scientists
American women academics
Fellows of the American Association for the Advancement of Science
21st-century American women